Alice Elizabeth Locke Park (February 2, 1861 – October 17, 1961) was an American suffragist and a longtime defender of women's rights. She served as associate director of the Susan B. Anthony Memorial Committee of California.

Early life

On February 2, 1861, Alice Elizabeth Locke was born in Boston, Massachusetts. In 1884, she married Dean W. Park; they had two children. Her husband died in 1909.

Career

In the late 1870s, Park became interested in the suffrage movement and attended conventions in Providence, Rhode Island in 1877 and 1879. In 1894, she joined the International Feminist Movement. Park became a pacifist in 1898. She was also a socialist and a vegetarian. 

She framed two pieces of California state legislation: the 1909 California Bird and Arbor Day Act legislated the protection of trees and birds and established a day for school children to be instructed in these environmental issues; and the bill which ensured equal guardianship of minor children to both parents. In the 1910s, she was State Chairman of the Literature Committee of the Political Equality League.

She was a member of the Women's Suffrage Association for 60 years. Once women's suffrage was legalized in California in 1911, she was a speaker at the Seventh Conference of the International Woman Suffrage Alliance in Budapest, Hungary, in 1913. 

In 1914, she declared: "I sympathize deeply with the tactics of the militants in London. I am tired of the English women being blamed for crudeness and for their violence. To them a great deal of credit is due for getting the votes for women in California, in giving publicity to the cause. If they did not destroy property and do things out of the ordinary, no one would pay any attention to them, and their action would be a pure loss."

She quit the Unitarian society over its failure to oppose World War I. She was a Delegate to International Women's Congress for Peace and Freedom at the Hague in 1915; in 1915 she was a member of Ford Peace Ship; she was a leader of the Women's International League for Peace and Freedom (WILPF). She founded Palo Alto Women's Peace Party in 1915.

She protested Stanford University’s establishment of a female quota for women and battled for women's rights. In her homes (at 611 Gilman and 510 Hamilton streets in Palo Alto) she held meetings for a pacifist group called the American Union Against Militarism. This later became the American Civil Liberties Union.

Animal rights

Park was a supporter of the Humanitarian League, a British animal rights organization, and visited schools to give talks on animals. She won the praise of the organization's founder Henry S. Salt for printing a card, in 1920, that stated: "Be Kind to Animals, For You Are One Yourself."

Death and legacy
Park died on October 18, 1961, at her home in Palo Alto, California. She was 100 years old.

References

Further reading

External links
 Alice Park at Social Networks and Archival Context

1861 births
1961 deaths
Activists from Boston
American centenarians
American feminists
American humanitarians
American pacifists
American socialists
American suffragists
American women's rights activists
Animal welfare workers
Children's rights activists
Women centenarians